Risto Puustinen (born 28 September 1959) is a Finnish football manager and a former footballer. He is currently the head coach of Musan Salama.

Puustinen played five seasons in the Finnish premier division Mestaruussarja for PPT Pori and HJK Helsinki from 1984 to 1988. He capped 11 times for the Finland national team.

Honors 
Finnish Championship: 1985, 1988, 1988

References 

1959 births
Finnish football managers
Finnish footballers
Finland international footballers
FC Jazz players
Helsingin Jalkapalloklubi players
Living people
Association football forwards
Association football midfielders
Ässät football players
Pargas Idrottsförening players